There were 2 female and 5 male athletes representing the country at the 2000 Summer Paralympics. Jordan won its first gold medal in the games.

Medallists

See also
Jordan at the 2000 Summer Olympics
Jordan at the Paralympics

References

Bibliography

External links
International Paralympic Committee

Nations at the 2000 Summer Paralympics
Paralympics
2000